Jean Dondelinger (4 July 1931 – 21 October 2004) was a Luxembourgian diplomat and civil servant.  He served as Luxembourg's European Commissioner, as well as holding positions in the domestic civil service and the diplomatic service.

|-

1931 births
2004 deaths
Luxembourgian European Commissioners
Luxembourgian diplomats
University of Paris alumni
Alumni of St Antony's College, Oxford
Luxembourgian civil servants
Commandeurs of the Ordre des Arts et des Lettres
Luxembourgian expatriates in France